Live in New York is a live album from Joe Cocker, recorded in New York's Central Park on July 12th, 1980 to an audience of 20,000 people. Originally the album was released in Australia and Japan only (in Japan as Spirit of Live Concert). It was reissued on CD in Australia by Mushroom Records in 1999.

Track listing

Personnel
 Joe Cocker – vocals
 Mitch Chakour -music director, piano, guitar, background vocals
 Cliff Goodwin – guitar
 Howie Hersh – bass guitar
 B. J. Wilson – drums
 Bob Leinbach – keyboards
 Maxine Green – background vocals
 Ann Lang – background vocals
 Beth Anderson – background vocals

Production notes
 Executive producer: Michael Lang
 Producer: Robert Deitsch
 Engineering crew: George Thomas Musgrave, James P. McGuire, Gene Maxwell, Frank D'Ella

References

1980 live albums
Joe Cocker live albums
Albums recorded at Central Park
Liberation Records albums
Mushroom Records live albums